Wallace's scops owl (Otus silvicola) lives on Sumbawa and Flores islands, in the Lesser Sundas chain of Indonesia. It is not rare in most of its habitat and has no subspecies except for the nominate. It is also known as the Lesser Sunda scops owl.

It is named after Alfred Russel Wallace, a British naturalist, explorer, geographer, and biologist.

References

http://www.owlpages.com/owls.php?genus=Otus&species=silvicola

Wallace's scops owl
Birds of the Lesser Sunda Islands
Wallace's scops owl